Jackson County is a county located in the U.S. state of Indiana.  As of 2010, the population was 42,376.  The county seat is Brownstown.

History
Jackson County was formed in 1816. It was named after General Andrew Jackson.

Jackson County was the site of the first recorded train robbery of a moving train in the United States. On October 6, 1866, the Reno Gang robbed an Ohio and Mississippi Railway train, making off with over $10,000.

Jackson County has the second longest 3-span covered bridge in the world; The Medora Covered Bridge. After a recent project to completely refurbish the Medora Covered Bridge, the nearby town of Medora now holds an annual event at the bridge. The bridge is open for pedestrian traffic and site-seers. Another long neglected covered bridge, the Bells Ford Bridge, believed to have been the last remaining Post Truss bridge in the world, succumbed to neglect, collapsing into the White River on January 2, 2006.

Geography

Cities
 Seymour

Towns
 Brownstown
 Crothersville
 Medora

Census-designated places
 Freetown
 Vallonia

Other unincorporated places
 Kurtz
 Norman Station
 Tampico
 Uniontown

Townships

 Brownstown
 Carr
 Driftwood
 Grassy Fork
 Hamilton
 Jackson
 Owen
 Pershing
 Redding
 Salt Creek
 Vernon
 Washington

Adjacent counties
 Brown County  (north-northwest)
 Bartholomew County  (north-northeast)
 Jennings County  (east)
 Scott County  (southeast)
 Washington County  (south)
 Lawrence County (west)
 Monroe County (northwest)

Major highways
Sources:  National Atlas, U.S. Census Bureau
  Interstate 65
  U.S. Route 31
  U.S. Route 50
  State Road 11
  State Road 39
  State Road 58
  State Road 135
  State Road 235
  State Road 250
  State Road 256
  State Road 258

National protected areas
 Hoosier National Forest (part)
 Muscatatuck National Wildlife Refuge (part)

Climate and weather 

Government

The county government is a constitutional body, and is granted specific powers by the Constitution of Indiana, and by the Indiana Code.

County Council: The county council is the fiscal body of the county government and controls all the spending and revenue collection in the county. The 7 representatives are elected from 4 county districts and 3 at-large positions. The council members serve four-year terms. They are responsible for setting salaries, the annual budget, and special spending. The council also has limited authority to impose local taxes, in the form of an income and property tax that is subject to state level approval, excise taxes, and service taxes.

Board of Commissioners: The executive body of the county is made of a board of commissioners. The commissioners are elected county-wide, in staggered terms, and each serves a four-year term. One of the commissioners, typically the most senior, serves as president. The commissioners are charged with executing the acts legislated by the council, collecting revenue, and managing the day-to-day functions of the county government.

Court: The county maintains a small claims court that can handle some civil cases. The judge on the court is elected to a term of six years and must be a member of the Indiana Bar Association. The judge is assisted by a constable who is also elected to a four-year term. In some cases, court decisions can be appealed to the state level circuit court.

County Officials: The county has several other elected offices, including sheriff, coroner, auditor, treasurer, recorder, surveyor, and circuit court clerk Each of these elected officers serves a term of four years and oversees a different part of county government. Members elected to county government positions are required to declare party affiliations and to be residents of the county.

Jackson County is part of Indiana's 9th congressional district and was represented in Congress by Republican Todd Young until Young was elected to the Senate. Since then, it has been represented by Trey Hollingsworth.  It is also part of Indiana Senate districts 44 and 45 and Indiana House of Representatives districts 65, 66,69 and 73.

Demographics

As of the 2010 United States Census, there were 42,376 people, 16,501 households, and 11,629 families residing in the county. The racial makeup of the county was 94.5% white, 0.8% Asian, 0.7% black or African American, 0.2% American Indian, 0.1% Pacific islander, 2.4% from other races, and 1.3% from two or more races. Those of Hispanic or Latino origin made up 5.7% of the population. In terms of ancestry, 28.8% were German, 13.1% were American, 12.8% were Irish, and 9.2% were English.

Of the 16,501 households, 33.7% had children under the age of 18 living with them, 54.4% were married couples living together, 10.8% had a female householder with no husband present, 29.5% were non-families, and 24.4% of all households were made up of individuals. The average household size was 2.53 and the average family size was 2.98. The median age was 38.7 years.

The median income for a household in the county was $47,697 and the median income for a family was $53,534. Males had a median income of $38,608 versus $30,030 for females. The per capita income for the county was $21,498. About 7.6% of families and 11.1% of the population were below the poverty line, including 13.7% of those under age 18 and 6.3% of those age 65 or over.

See also
 The Tribune, daily newspaper covering Jackson County
 National Register of Historic Places listings in Jackson County, Indiana

External links
 Jackson County Visitor Center

References

 
Indiana counties
1816 establishments in Indiana
Populated places established in 1816